The Duquesne Dukes men's soccer team is a varsity intercollegiate athletic team of Duquesne University in Pittsburgh, United States. The team is a member of the Atlantic 10 Conference, which is part of the National Collegiate Athletic Association's Division I. Duquesne's first men's soccer team was fielded in 1995. The team plays its home games at Rooney Field in Pittsburgh. The Dukes are coached by Chase Brooks.

Seasons

1995 inaugural season team history

First Game, NCAA Division-1 Men's Soccer: Saturday, September 2, 1995, vs. James Madison University, at JMU Sheraton Inn Invitational (L, 4–1).

First Loss: Saturday, September 2, 1995, vs. James Madison University, at JMU Sheraton Inn Invitational (L, 4–1).

First Goal: Charlie Roberts, September 2, 1995, vs. James Madison University, at JMU Sheraton Inn Invitational (L, 4–1).

First Assist: Anthony Gallo JR, September 2, 1995, vs. James Madison University, at JMU Sheraton Inn Invitational (L, 4–1).

First Win: Sunday, September 24, 1995, vs. Niagara University, at Arthur J. Rooney Field, Pittsburgh, PA (W, 8–1).

First Win (GK): Jarrod Duffy, September 24, 1995, vs. Niagara University, at Arthur J. Rooney Field, Pittsburgh, PA (W, 8–1).

References

External links 
 

 
Soccer clubs in Philadelphia
1995 establishments in Pennsylvania
Association football clubs established in 1995